Area code 813 is an area code in the North American Numbering Plan (NANP) for the city of Tampa, Florida, and surrounding areas such as Zephyrhills and Oldsmar.

Due to complete exhaustion of central office prefixes in area code 813, Area code 656 came in service on February 22, 2022, being overlaid with 813.

Service area
Area codes 656/813 is assigned to a numbering plan area (NPA) that comprises all of Hillsborough County, the city of Oldsmar in Pinellas County, and the central and southeastern portions of Pasco County. The northeastern portion of Pasco County has area code 352, while the western portion uses area code 727.

History
Area code 813 became Florida's second area code in 1953, when numbering plan area 305, which originally comprised all of the State of Florida, was split. The new number plan area stretched along the Gulf Coast from Pasco County to Collier County and included the cities of St. Petersburg, Sarasota, Fort Myers, and Lakeland.

On March 3, 1996, thirteen counties south and east of Hillsborough County, from Manatee County to Collier County, split from the numbering plan area 813 after 39 years in the coverage area and were assigned area code 941.

Although the 1996 split was intended to be a long-term solution, within only two years, 813 was close to exhaustion again because of the rapid growth of telephone service in the Tampa Bay area and the proliferation of cell phones and pagers. The Florida Public Service Commission decided to assign area code 727 as another area code for the region. It was originally planned to be an overlay on 813. However, overlays were still a new concept, and the mixing of area codes in the same region, and the resulting requirement for ten-digit dialing, met considerable resistance. As a result, the area of most of Pinellas County (except Oldsmar) and western Pasco County were split off on February 1, 1999 and received area code 727.

Oldsmar kept area code 813 despite being in Pinellas. Oldsmar was a tributary service area to the Tampa area, and tributary routes were in general not cut across NPA boundaries. Oldsmar is also located on the Pinellas/Hillsborough line, and was the only local exchange that was a local call to both cities. Most of the dialup Internet access numbers and alarm system reporting numbers in Tampa and St. Petersburg were located in Oldsmar. GTE and the Florida Public Service Commission wanted to spare alarm companies and ISPs the cost of reprogramming and replacing systems that could not handle 10 digit dialing.

Available numbers for area code 813 are expected to be exhausted during the third quarter of 2022. As a result, the North American Numbering Plan Administrator proposed an "all services overlay", which was approved by the Florida Public Service Commission on March 31, 2020. The new area code 656 is scheduled for initiation of service in mid-to-late February 2022, once all available central office prefixes of 813 have been assigned. This requires ten-digit dialing within the numbering plan area, with recorded messages passed on to callers dialling the old method.

See also
List of Florida area codes
List of NANP area codes

References

External links
Florida's Area Code History

813
813
Telecommunications-related introductions in 1953
1953 establishments in Florida